Sophie Charlene Akland Monk (born 14 December 1979) is an Australian singer, actress, model, and television personality. She was a member of the pop girl group Bardot, winners of the first season of Popstars Australia in 2000, and later released a solo album titled Calendar Girl (2003). She has appeared in films, including Date Movie (2006), Click (2006), Sex and Death 101 (2007), The Hills Run Red (2009), and Spring Breakdown (2009). 

Monk was the winner of the fourth season of The Celebrity Apprentice Australia in 2015, and in 2016, she was a judge on Australia's Got Talent. In 2017, she starred on the third season of The Bachelorette Australia, and the following year, she became the host of Love Island Australia. In 2021, Monk began hosting Beauty and the Geek Australia.

Early life
Sophie Monk was born in London, England to an English father and an Australian mother. In 1982 her parents moved to Australia's Gold Coast in Queensland when she was two years old. She attended Helensvale Primary School, St Hilda's, Somerset College, A. B. Paterson College and MacGregor State High School, where she graduated as school captain in 1997. She was trained in classical opera growing up. Following graduation, Monk worked as a Marilyn Monroe impersonator at Warner Bros. Movie World on the Gold Coast.

Music career

Bardot

Monk's professional music career began in 1999 when she responded to an advertisement at the recommendation of her mother which requested girls with vocal and dance experience. The advertisement was for an Australian reality television series, Popstars, a TV talent show which aimed to create a successful new girl group. In one audition, she performed a rendition of Marilyn Monroe's famous "Happy Birthday, Mr. President", working on her previous experience as a Monroe impersonator. After numerous rounds of singing and dancing workshops, Monk was selected as a member of the group, which was named Bardot.

Bardot became the first Australian act to debut at the No. 1 position with both its debut single, "Poison", and self-titled debut album. Further singles "I Should've Never Let You Go" and "These Days" followed and in August, the group embarked on its first national tour. Bardot performed at the 2000 ARIA Awards at which they were nominated in three categories. In July 2001, the group released "ASAP", the first single from their second album. Bardot now had more control over their music and image. The single peaked Top 5, as did follow-up single, "I Need Somebody", their most successful single since "Poison". The second album, Play It Like That debuted at No. 16, achieving gold status. Monk co-wrote the album track "Feel Right" with bandmate Sally Polihronas. In 2002, final single, "Love Will Find A Way" completed Bardot's string of consecutive Top 20 hits and the group embarked on its second national tour. In May, the group disbanded.

Solo career

In 2002, Monk signed a recording contract with Warner Music Australia and started working on a solo album. The first single "Inside Outside" was released in October 2002 and was produced by Grammy Award winning music producer Rob Davis. Monk performed the song at the 2002 The Footy Show Grand Finale to promote the single. The track peaked at No. 5 on the ARIA Singles Chart and went on to sell over 35,000 copies worldwide. Her next single, "Get the Music On", peaked at No. 10 on the ARIA Singles Chart. On 5 May 2003 Monk released her debut album Calendar Girl which peaked at No. 35 on the ARIA Albums Chart. The album received mixed reviews from critics with Monk co-writing four of the album's tracks. Following the release of the album Monk released her third and final single, "One Breath Away", which peaked at No. 23 on the ARIA Singles Chart. In 2004, Monk parted ways with Warner Music Group.

In April 2017, Monk performed with country singer Kasey Chambers at Byron Bay Bluesfest. She has expressed interest in releasing country music in the future.

Acting career 

In 2004, Monk made her acting debut in a bit role on the Nine Network made-for-television film The Mystery of Natalie Wood portraying the role of Marilyn Monroe. That same year, Monk appeared in the music video Always by Pop Punk band Blink-182. Monk has had small roles in films such as Click, Murder World and Spring Break '83.

In 2005, Monk relocated to Los Angeles, California to pursue a career in acting. Monk quickly landed her break-out role in the spoof comedy film Date Movie. In July 2007, Monk made her American television debut in the HBO Comedy series Entourage. That same year she appeared in the dark comedy Sex and Death 101.

Monk starred in the Warner Premiere comedy film Spring Breakdown alongside Parker Posey and Amy Poehler. Filming took place in South Padre in 2006. Monk portrayed the role of the film's antagonist a bimbo sorority girl named Mason. The film underwent a long post-production period suffering distribution problems. The film premiered at the Sundance Film Festival to negative reviews. The film was released straight-to-DVD in June 2009.

In September 2008, Dark Castle Entertainment announced Monk was cast in the slasher horror film The Hills Run Red. Filming began at the start of 2009 in Sofia, Bulgaria and premiered at UK Frightfest. The film was released straight-to-DVD in September 2009 to mixed reviews from critics with some praising Monk's performance. In September 2008, Monk announced she was developing her own reality television series titled Bigger Than Paris. Monk filmed the pilot in January 2010 in Los Angeles, California.

In April 2013, Monk was working on a sitcom with actor Sam Worthington. Monk talked about her struggles as an actress and revealed that she has produced five television pilots for major networks, but they haven't been picked up. "Shows that were meant to get the green light, didn't, and movies that were meant to be massive, weren't, but I just keep going and going," she said. In 2015, Monk was added to the cast for the remake movie of Blood Feast.

Other ventures

Television 
In April 2010, Nine Network announced Monk would be a special guest presenter on the travel television program Getaway. Following her first appearance, Nine announced Monk would continue appearing on the series in a recurring form from then on. As part of her role, she has visited Hawaii, Las Vegas, Mexico.

In May 2012, Monk was announced to be one of the celebrities to have signed up for the FOX dating-show The Choice. The series is a spin-off to The Voice and sees celebrity judges sitting with their backs turned to a pool of "sexy singles" hoping to score a date with a celebrity. The series premiered on 7 June 2012.

On 28 October 2015, it was confirmed that Monk would be a new judge on Australia's Got Talent replacing Geri Halliwell for its eighth season alongside Kelly Osbourne, Eddie Perfect and Ian "Dicko" Dickson.

In 2015, Monk was declared the winner of the fourth season of The Celebrity Apprentice Australia.

In April 2017, it was announced that Monk would star on The Bachelorette Australia. In December, she was announced as the host of Love Island Australia, which aired on 27 May 2018 on 9Go!.

In 2020, Monk was revealed to be a participant on the second season of The Masked Singer Australia, performing as the "Dragonfly". She was the fifth contestant eliminated, placing 8th overall.

On 16 September 2020, Monk was announced as the new host for the revival of Beauty and the Geek Australia on Nine Network in 2021.

In December 2021, Monk was announced as one of the four celebrity contestants for the Lego Masters Bricksmas Special alongside journalist Brooke Boney, radio and TV presenter Wippa and television presenter Scott Cam. She was partnered up with season one winner Henry.

Radio 
In 2013, Monk filled in for Fifi Box on Fifi and Jules whilst Box was on maternity leave.

In December 2013, Monk along with Jules Lund, Merrick Watts and Mel B were announced as the new hosts of the 2Day FM breakfast show replacing Kyle and Jackie O Show.

In October 2014, Southern Cross Austereo announced that Jules, Merrick & Sophie on 2Day FM would be axed due to poor ratings throughout the year and replaced by The Dan & Maz Show.

Since then, Monk has been a regular fixture on KIIS 1065's Kyle and Jackie O Show and has hosted The Summer Fling breakfast show with Matty Acton on KIIS 1065 and KIIS 101.1.

Endorsements 
Monk has appeared in several commercials for Diet Vanilla Coke, Pepsi Max, LG Electronics, Coca-Cola and Expozay Swimwear. In 2012, she appeared in a billboard campaign for Angel Champagne on the famous La Cienega Boulevard in Hollywood.

In 2019, Monk became the brand ambassador for Australian health snack brand Slim Secrets and cosmetic brand MCO Beauty.

Public image
 Monk is often spotlighted for her looks. In October 2012, Monk was ranked number 7 on Maxim Australia's Hot 100. She ranked at No. 96 in the Maxim Hot 100 List of 2011. She was No. 2 in FHM Sexiest Women List in 2003.

Monk is also well known for her modelling career and has appeared on the cover of several men's magazines, including Maxim, FHM, Stuff and Ralph. In August 2008 and again in 2011, she was offered $1 million to pose for Playboy magazine, which she declined. Monk commented about the offer, "When I was younger I was like, 'I want to be on Playboy.' My mum was a Playmate, she was hot." In 2014 she accepted an offer to be photographed for Playboy. The photos were posted exclusively for viewing on the magazine's website, Playboy Plus. Commenting about her pictorial Monk said, "Marilyn Monroe did Playboy. It's an iconic brand, and let's get real... You only live once and I don't plan on dieting forever... I miss pizza too much!"

Personal life
Monk was engaged to American guitarist Benji Madden, but the couple split up in February 2008.

In February 2010, Monk was photographed in a wheelchair following a car crash in Los Angeles.

In January 2011, Monk announced her engagement to Jimmy Esebag. A few months later Monk announced on Chelsea Lately that she had separated from Esebag.

In 2013, Monk revealed she has had a stalker who wanted to kill her. "He thought he could hear me screaming in the corner of his hospital room and thought I wanted to die. So I wrote to him and told him I was fine," she said.

In October 2017, after completion of The Bachelorette Australia, Monk began a steady relationship with the winner, Stu Laundy.  In January 2018, she broke off the relationship by announcing it on Instagram.

In 2018, Monk was diagnosed with endometriosis at the age of 38.

In 2022, Sophie Monk married Joshua Gross in a secret ceremony at their New South Wales home after being in a relationship since 2018.

Discography

Albums

Singles

Miscellaneous

Filmography

Film

Television

Music videos

References

External links

 
 
 

1979 births
Living people
Australian film actresses
English emigrants to Australia
Australian expatriate actresses in the United States
Musicians from Gold Coast, Queensland
People educated at MacGregor State High School
21st-century Australian actresses
The Apprentice Australia candidates
The Apprentice (franchise) winners
Monk, Sophie
Bardot (Australian band) members
Bachelor Nation contestants
21st-century Australian singers
21st-century Australian women singers
Australian female models
People with Endometriosis